Feel Good Food is a bi-monthly cookery magazine published by IPC Media. It is a spin-off from Woman & Home magazine and is edited by Jane Curran.

Early history
The magazine launched as a quarterly magazine in 2008 after a one-off for Christmas edition in 2007. In November 2011 IPC Media decided to increase the publication to six copies a year.

See also
 Feel Good You

References

External links
 

2008 establishments in the United Kingdom
Bi-monthly magazines published in the United Kingdom
English-language magazines
Food and drink magazines
Magazines established in 2008
Quarterly magazines published in the United Kingdom